Peter Sarantopoulos (born 2 May 1968) is a former Canadian international soccer defender.

Club career
Sarantopolous was a two-time First Team and one-time Second Team Canadian Interuniversity Sport All-Canadian with the University of Toronto Varsity Blues.

He played for the North York Rockets in the Canadian Soccer League from 1988 to 1992, where he was named a league All-Star in 1991 and 1992. During the 1992 season, he was traded to the Winnipeg Fury.

He played for Toronto Blizzard during the 1993 American Professional Soccer League season, as well their replacements the Toronto Rockets for the APSL's 1994 campaign.

In 1996, he signed with St. Catharines Wolves of the Canadian National Soccer League. He made his debut on 2 June 1996 in a match against Toronto Italia. With St. Catharines, he won the CNSL Cup and reached the playoff finals, but were defeated by Toronto Italia. In the winter of 1996 he played at the indoor level with Toronto Shooting Stars in the National Professional Soccer League.

Sarantopoulos played the 1998 season in the Toronto Lynx in the USISL A-League.

International career
Sarantopoulos played for Canada at the 1987 FIFA World Youth Championship and the 1987 Pan American Games. He made his senior debut for Canada in a February 1988 friendly match against Bermuda. He earned a total of 33 caps, scoring no goals. He has represented Canada in 6 FIFA World Cup qualification matches. He also played at the inaugural 1989 FIFA Futsal World Championship.

His final international game was a March 1993 friendly match against South Korea.

References

External links
 
 

 

1968 births
Living people
Soccer players from Toronto
Canadian people of Greek descent
Canadian soccer players
Canada men's international soccer players
Canadian men's futsal players
North York Rockets players
St. Catharines Roma Wolves players
Winnipeg Fury players
Toronto Blizzard (1986–1993) players
Toronto Rockets players
Toronto Lynx players
Toronto Shooting Stars players
Canadian Soccer League (1987–1992) players
American Professional Soccer League players
A-League (1995–2004) players
Pan American Games competitors for Canada
Footballers at the 1987 Pan American Games
Canada men's youth international soccer players
Canadian National Soccer League players
Association football defenders
National Professional Soccer League (1984–2001) players